Videophilia (and Other Viral Syndromes) is a 2015 Peruvian horror comedy-drama fantasy film directed by Juan Daniel F. Molero. It premiered during the 2015 edition of the International Film Festival Rotterdam where it was awarded with the Tiger Award. Later it was selected as the Peruvian entry for the Best Foreign Language Film at the 89th Academy Awards but it was not nominated.

Cast
 Muki Sabogal as Luz
 TerOm as Junior
 Liliana Albornoz as Rosa
 Caterina Gueli Rojo as Virus
 Rafael Gutiérrez as Killer
 Michel Lovón as Mike
 Tilsa Otta as Luz's Sister
 José Gabriel Alegría Sabogal as Luis
 Manuel Siles as Luz's father

See also
 List of submissions to the 89th Academy Awards for Best Foreign Language Film
 List of Peruvian submissions for the Academy Award for Best Foreign Language Film

References

External links
 

2015 films
2015 comedy-drama films
2015 horror films
2015 fantasy films
Peruvian fantasy films
Peruvian comedy-drama films
Peruvian horror films
2010s Peruvian films
2010s Spanish-language films
Films about teenagers